Josep "Pep" Clarós Canals (born January 28, 1969) is a Spanish professional basketball coach with experience in Europe, Asia, Africa, North and South America.

He has been in 15 Finals so far with different teams in different countries as a Head coach. He has NCAA, CBA, ACB, Eurocup, Uleb, Euroleague, Liga de las Americas, Olympic Games Tournament, Afrobasket and World Cup Qualifiers. He has been  Head Coach with 5 National Teams. He is the first coach (in any sport) in history who has won a championship or medal in four different continents as a head coach.

International career 

En 2012, Clarós won la Liga de las Americas in Formosa, Argentina
On March 27, 2015, Clarós, who was planning to coach the Egypt national basketball team at the 2015 FIBA Africa Championship and potentially the 2016 Summer Olympics, confirmed that he would not. He said, "I wish them all the best for the next AfroBasket and African games with the goal to qualify for the Olympics in Rio 2016." He loves to implement a full court press defence.

In 2017, Clarós signed with Akita Northern Happinets in Japan.

In 2020, he signed with Rizing Zephyr Fukuoka.

Head coaching record

|-
| style="text-align:left;"|Ulla Oil Rosalía
| style="text-align:left;"|2000-01
| 30||10||20|||| style="text-align:center;"|13th|||-||-||-||
| style="text-align:center;"|-
|-
| style="text-align:left;"|Ulla Oil Rosalía
| style="text-align:left;"|2001-02
| 30||10||20|||| style="text-align:center;"|13th|||-||-||-||
| style="text-align:center;"|-
|-
| style="text-align:left;"|CB Tarragona
| style="text-align:left;"|2002-03
| 30||12||18|||| style="text-align:center;"|12th|||-||-||-||
| style="text-align:center;"|-
|-
| style="text-align:left;"|CB Tarragona
| style="text-align:left;"|2003-04
| 34||15||19|||| style="text-align:center;"|13th|||-||-||-||
| style="text-align:center;"|-
|-
| style="text-align:left;"|CB Tarragona
| style="text-align:left;"|2004-05
| 34||18||16|||| style="text-align:center;"|7th|||4||1||3||
| style="text-align:center;"|Lost in 1st Round
|-
| style="text-align:left;"|Hanzevast Capitals
| style="text-align:left;"|2007-08
| 40||24||16|||| style="text-align:center;"|5th|||3||1||2||
| style="text-align:center;"|Lost in 1st Round
|-
| style="text-align:left;"|Halifax Rainmen
| style="text-align:left;"|2011-12
| 36||23||13|||| style="text-align:center;"|2nd|||8||5||3||
| style="text-align:center;"|Runners-up
|-
| style="text-align:left;"|Pioneros de Quintana Roo
| style="text-align:left;"|2012-13
| 40||28||12|||| style="text-align:center;"|6th|||8||4||4||
| style="text-align:center;"|Lost in 2nd Round
|-
| style="text-align:left;"|Halifax Rainmen
| style="text-align:left;"|2014-15
| 32||20||12|||| style="text-align:center;"|1st in Atlantic|||16||10||4||
| style="text-align:center;"|Runners-up
|-
| style="text-align:left;"|Al Muharraq
| style="text-align:left;"|2015-16
| 5||3||2|||| style="text-align:center;"|5th|||-||-||-||
| style="text-align:center;"|-
|-
| style="text-align:left;"|Rizing Fukuoka
| style="text-align:left;"|2016
| 12||6||6|||| style="text-align:center;"|8th in Bj Western|||2||0||2||
| style="text-align:center;"|Lost in 1st Round
|-
|- style="background:#FDE910;"
| style="text-align:left;"|Al Manama
| style="text-align:left;"|2016-17
| 16||15||0|||| style="text-align:center;"|1st|||6||5||1||
| style="text-align:center;"|Champions
|-
| style="text-align:left;"|Akita Northern Happinets
| style="text-align:left;"|2017-18
| 60||style="background:#E0CEF2;|54||style="background:#E0CEF2;|6||style="background:#E0CEF2;| || style="text-align:center;"|1st in B2 Eastern|||5||3||2||
| style="text-align:center;"|Runners-up in B2
|-
| style="text-align:left;"|Akita Northern Happinets
| style="text-align:left;"|2018-19
| 60||17||43|||| style="text-align:center;"|5th in Eastern|||-||-||-||
| style="text-align:center;"|-
|-
| style="text-align:left;"|Rizing Zephyr Fukuoka
| style="text-align:left;"|2019-20
| 15||4||11|||| style="text-align:center;"| 6th in B2 Western|||-||-||-||
| style="text-align:center;"|-
|-
| style="text-align:left;"|Rizing Zephyr Fukuoka
| style="text-align:left;"|2020-21
| 59||26||33|||| style="text-align:center;"| 5th in B2 Western|||-||-||-||
| style="text-align:center;"|-

References

External links 
Pep Clarós at ACB.com
Claros signs deal to coach Bahrain
Pep Claros Chama Quinze Novos Rostos
Jarrett Stephens Sabia Que Podia Brilhar Na Liga
Claros to coach senior basketball team
Entrenador errante
Marco Polo con pizarra
NYTimes.com Basketball St John's Artest creates some excitment in his first start
GDN Online
Northern Happinets News

1969 births
Living people
Akita Northern Happinets coaches
Catalan basketball coaches
Central American and Caribbean Games silver medalists for Mexico
Competitors at the 2010 Central American and Caribbean Games
Continental Basketball Association coaches
Donar (basketball club) coaches
Joventut Badalona coaches
Rizing Zephyr Fukuoka coaches
Spanish basketball coaches
Spanish expatriate basketball people in Canada
Spanish expatriate basketball people in the United States
Sportspeople from Barcelona
University of Barcelona alumni
Central American and Caribbean Games medalists in basketball